Thaiphum (Thaiphum Chin) is a Southern Kuki-Chin language spoken in 4 villages of Matupi township, Chin State, Burma.

References

Kuki-Chin languages
Languages of Myanmar